Miyan Jolgeh County is a county (shahrestan) in Razavi Khorasan province of Iran. At the 2006 census, its population was 37,117, in 9,417 families. Eshqabad is the center of this county.  This county had previously had three rural districts (dehestan): Belharat Rural District, Eshqabad Rural District, and Ghazali Rural District.

References 

Districts of Razavi Khorasan Province
Nishapur County